Masoud Mostafa Jokar (born September 21, 1977 in Jowkar) is an Iranian wrestler who competed in the Men's Freestyle 60 kg at the 2004 Summer Olympics and won the silver medal.
Masoud was born in an athletic family and after his good demonstration in Takhti Cup Tehran, 1999, he was invited to the camp of national teams for Olympic preparation. He was the spare of Mohammad Talaei, Iranian wrestler in 63 kg However he became a fixed member of the team in next Olympic where he won his silver medal.

References

External links
 
 

1977 births
Living people
Olympic wrestlers of Iran
Wrestlers at the 2004 Summer Olympics
Olympic silver medalists for Iran
Place of birth missing (living people)
Olympic medalists in wrestling
Wrestlers at the 2002 Asian Games
Wrestlers at the 2006 Asian Games
Iranian male sport wrestlers
Medalists at the 2004 Summer Olympics
Asian Games competitors for Iran
20th-century Iranian people
21st-century Iranian people